"Maybe" is a pop song written by Allan Flynn and Frank Madden that was published in 1940.

Recordings in 1940

The first version to chart was recorded on June 11, 1940 by the Ink Spots featuring Bill Kenny and released by Decca Records as catalog number 3258, with the A-side "Whispering Grass". The recording reached #2 on the chart that year. The Ink Spots' version of the song was also used as the opening theme for the first game of the Fallout franchise. The game's sequels, Fallout 3, 4 and 76, also use this song on their in-game radios.

Another charting version was recorded by Dinah Shore on June 25, 1940, and released by Bluebird Records as catalog number 10793, with the flip side "The Nearness of You". This version reached #17 on the charts.

Bobby Byrne and his orchestra also charted with the song that year, reaching #19. His version was recorded on July 19, 1940, with a vocal by Jimmy Palmer, and released by Decca as catalog number 3392A. The flip side was "One Look at You".

A recording by the Sammy Kaye orchestra, with Tommy Ryan as vocalist, was recorded on May 31, 1940 and released by Victor as catalog number 26643. The flip side was "Blueberry Hill".

The Bob Chester orchestra, with a vocal by Dolores O'Neill, also recorded the song. Their version, recorded May 17, 1940 was released by Bluebird Records as catalog number 10752. The flip side was "Pushin' the Conversation Along".

Another 1940 recording, on June 3, was done by Gene Krupa and released by OKeh as catalog number 5643, with the flip side "I'll Never Smile Again".

Other 1940 recordings were done by British vocalists Vera Lynn and Anne Shelton.

1952 revival

The song was revived as a duet by Perry Como and Eddie Fisher, recorded on May 13, 1952, which was released by RCA Victor Records, with the flip side "Watermelon Weather," as a 78 rpm single (catalog number 20-4744) and a 45 rpm single (catalog number 47-4744) in the United States reaching #3 on the charts in 52. This recording with the same flip side was also issued by HMV Records in the United Kingdom as a 78 rpm single, catalog number B-10289.

At that time, a cover recording was also made by Frankie Carle, released by RCA Victor as catalog number 20-4919, with the flip side "Walkin' My Baby Back Home".

Other recordings

Bunny Berigan
Doc Cheatham
Ella Fitzgerald (1968, on her Capitol album "30 By Ella")
Marty Grosz
Dick Haymes
Elliot Lawrence
Brenda Lee (1965)
Dean Martin (1957)
Smokey Pleacher (1962)
The Migil 5 (1964)
Jimmy Roselli (1967)
Kate Smith

References

1935 songs
The Ink Spots songs
Dinah Shore songs
Male vocal duets
Okeh Records singles
Bluebird Records singles
Decca Records singles